Galbena River may refer to:

 Galbena River (Jiu)
 Râul Galben, in Hunedoara County

See also 
 Galbenu River (disambiguation)